Bhati Bhasa is a dialect of Konkani spoken by Padye Brahmins of Goa who belong to the Karhade Brahmin group. This dialect is nasal and has many Marathi words. The people who speak this dialect are called Bhatts in Goa. The dialect is becoming endangered as many people are now turning towards marathi. 

Konkani
Brahmin communities by language